Hans Julius Duncker (26 May 1881 in Ballenstedt, Anhalt, now Saxony-Anhalt – 22 December 1961 in Saarbrücken) was a German ornithologist, geneticist and eugenicist.

Early life and career
He completed a PhD in zoology from the University of Göttingen in 1905. On 5 October 1907 he married  Elsa Zwerusmann (born 4 June 1884) in Dessau. He joined Bremer secondary school as a teacher of natural sciences and mathematics in 1909. In 1912 he became a member of the German Ornithological Society. In 1921, he began to work with Karl Reich, the first person to make recordings of bird song and who was well known for creating a strain of canaries that sang Nightingale Luscinia megarhynchos songs.

In the early 1920s, he began conducting several breeding experiments on birds to study the heritability of plumage colors and structures, such as the hood. From 1925 Duncker collaborated with Carl Hubert Cremer and extended his experiments to include budgerigars. He contributed regularly to the Journal of Ornithology and other ornithological journals.

References

1881 births
1961 deaths
German ornithologists
20th-century German zoologists
People from Ballenstedt